Veli Kızılkaya (born 1 February 1985) is a Turkish professional footballer who plays as a defender for Belediye Kütahyaspor. He was also a youth international, making one appearance for the Turkey national under-21 football team in 2006.

Club career
Kızılkaya began his career with Özel İdare Köyhizmetlerispor, an amateur club, in 1999. He was transferred to Kütahyaspor in 2001, and promoted to the senior team in 2003. Kahramanmaraşspor transferred him in 2005, and then sold him to Bucaspor in 2008. Kızılkaya was a part of the Bucaspor squad that earned promotion to the Süper Lig at the end of the 2009–10 season. In January 2011, he transferred from Bucaspor to Kayseri Erciyesspor.

On 31 August 2016, he rejoined Bucaspor on a one-year contract.

References

External links
 
 

1985 births
People from Kütahya Province
Living people
Turkish footballers
Turkey under-21 international footballers
Association football defenders
Kütahyaspor footballers
Kahramanmaraşspor footballers
Bucaspor footballers
Kayseri Erciyesspor footballers
Boluspor footballers
Göztepe S.K. footballers
Adanaspor footballers
Şanlıurfaspor footballers
Tuzlaspor players
Süper Lig players
TFF First League players
TFF Second League players
TFF Third League players